The following television stations broadcast on digital channel 11 in Mexico:

 XHAMO-TDT in Colima, Colima
 XHTDMX-TDT in Mexico City
 XHPBDG-TDT in Durango, Durango
 XHPBGZ-TDT in Ciudad Guzmán, Jalisco
 XHPBHU-TDT in Huetamo, Michoacán
 XHPBZC-TDT in Zacatlán, Puebla
 XHPBQR-TDT in Querétaro, Querétaro

11